The siege of La Charité was incited by the order of Charles VII to Joan of Arc after the  warlord Perrinet Gressard seized the town in 1423.

La Charité was not only strongly fortified, but fully victualled for a prolonged siege. Joan's forces were known to be poorly equipped with artillery. On November 7, 1429 the people of Clermont were addressed with a letter asking the town to send supplies to Joan's army for the siege. On November 9 Joan made another request for supplies in preparation. Charles II d'Albret, of Joan's army, sent a letter to Riom on the same day. The assistance came from Bourges and Orléans, which sent soldiers and artillerymen. However, after a month-long struggle in bad weather, the siege was abandoned.

See also
 Siege of Saint-Pierre-le-Moûtier

Notes

External links
Joan of Arc's letter to the people of Riom, Nov. 9, 1429

1429 in Europe
1420s in France
La Char
Armagnac–Burgundian Civil War
Conflicts in 1429
Nièvre
Hundred Years' War, 1415–1453
Sieges of the Hundred Years' War
Joan of Arc